Nicolaus Matthiae Rungius (also spelled Ryngius or Ryngen in contemporary sources; born ca. 1560 in Loimaa - died 1629 in Keminmaa) was a vicar of Keminmaa, Finland, known for his mummified body in the Keminmaa old church.

Rungius was born at the Rynkö homestead in Loimaa, and so he was named Ryngius (later changed to Rungius). He worked as a chaplain in the Nykarleby and Keminmaa churches. He married Helena, the daughter of the Kemi vicar Simon Ruuth, and followed his father-in-law as vicar. As vicar, he managed matters all over the Kemi Lapland area, but was not an unusual preacher during his lifetime. Rungius served as vicar during the Thirty Years' War and died in 1629. As was the custom at the time, he was buried underneath the church floor.

Rungius's reputation grew when his body, which had been mummified instead of decomposing, was found underneath the church floor during the Greater Wrath in the early 18th century. Thus started stories about his powerful words and miracles. A legend of sainthood proportions surrounded him and people went as far as to go on pilgrimages to see his body. Rungius has been claimed to have said during his life: "If my words are not true, my body will decompose, but if they are true, it will never decompose."

The special thing about Rungius's body is that it has not been intentionally protected from decomposition, but it has naturally dried up underneath the church floor. At least in 1875, the body still retained two arms, but one of them has later disappeared. It has apparently been taken as a relic.

The vicar's body is still in the Keminmaa old St. Michael Church underneath the floor between the altar and the sacristry, protected by glass. Visitors may see the mummy during summertime, when the church is open for tourists, but the corpse may not be photographed.

References

External links
 Prästen vars kropp inte förmultnar!  (in Swedish)

1560s births
1629 deaths
16th-century Finnish Lutheran clergy
Keminmaa
People from Loimaa
Mummies
17th-century Finnish Lutheran clergy